The  is a railway line operated by the private railway operator Tokyu Corporation. It runs through Tokyo, extending from Gotanda Station in Shinagawa to Kamata Station in Ōta.

New three-car 7000 series EMUs were introduced in December 2007, with a total of 19 sets delivered by 2011.

Station list 
All trains stop at all stations.

Rolling stock used

Current
 1000 series 3-car sets (since 1990)
 7000 series 3-car sets (since December 2007, shared with Tokyu Tamagawa Line)

Former
 7600 series 3-car sets (from 1986 to 2015)
 7700 series 3-car sets (from 1987 to 2018)

History

The line first opened on 6 October 1922 between Kamata and Ikegami, running 1.8 km. On 4 May 1923, this was extended 3.7 km from Ikegami to Yukigaya.

1926-08-06: Keidai Ground-mae Station opens (now Chidorichō Station).
1927-08-19: Chōfu-Ōtsuka Station opens between Yukigaya and Ontakesan.
1927-08-28: Section opens between Yukigaya and Kirigaya (now closed), located between Ōsaki-Hirokoji and Togoshi-Ginza (4.7 km).
1927-10-09: Line opens between Kirigaya and Ōsaki-Hirokoji (0.6 km).
1928-04-13: Ishikawa Station renamed Ishikawadai, and Suehiro Station renamed Higashi-Chōfu (now Kugahara).
1928-06-17: Line opens between Ōsaki-Hirokoji and Gotanda (0.3 km), completing line.
1933-06-01: Chōfu-Ōtsuka Station combined with Yukigaya Station and renamed Yukigaya-Ōtsuka; Ontakesan-mae Station renamed Ontakesan.
1936-01-01: Higashi-Chōfu Station renamed Kugahara; Keidai Ground-mae Station renamed Chidorichō.
1951-05-01: Hatagaoka Station moved to Hatanodai Station on Ōimachi Line.
1953-08-12: Kirigaya Station closes.

The line voltage was raised from 600 V to 1,500 V DC from 10 August 1957.

The 3000 series trains were withdrawn on 18 March 1989.

On 19 March 1989, Ebara-Nakanobu Station was moved underground.

From 16 March 1998, wanman driver-only operation commenced on the line.

See also
 List of railway lines in Japan

References
This article incorporates material from the corresponding article in the Japanese Wikipedia.

External links

 Tokyu Corporation website 

Ikegami Line
Railway lines in Tokyo
1067 mm gauge railways in Japan
Railway lines opened in 1922